Steven Barthelme (born 1947) is the author of numerous short stories and essays. His published works include And He Tells the Little Horse the Whole Story, Double Down: Reflections on Gambling and Loss (with brother Frederick Barthelme), and The Early Posthumous Work (essays which originally appeared in The New Yorker, New York Times, Oxford American, Elle Decor, and other publications). His brothers Donald and Frederick also became notable authors. His father, Donald Barthelme, Sr., was a well-known modernist architect in Houston.

He won Pushcart Prizes in 1993 and 2005, and in 2004 he won the Texas Institute of Letters Short Story Award for work published in Yale Review. Barthelme is said to  write in a distinctive "post-Southern" style.

He is the former director of The Center for Writers at The University of Southern Mississippi.

Bibliography

Collections
 And He Tells the Little Horse the Whole Story. Johns Hopkins, 1987.
 The Early Posthumous Work. Red Hen Press, 2010.
 Hush Hush: Stories. Melville House, 2012.

Nonfiction
 'White Guy.' Brevity, 2011.
 'Talent and Fifty Cents'. Essay Daily, 2014
 Double Down: Reflections on Gambling and Loss.  Houghton Mifflin, 1999.

Awards
Pushcart Prize, short story, "Claire," from Yale Review, 2005
Listed in "100 Distinguished Short Stories" Best American Short Stories 2004, 2004
Texas Institute of Letters, Short Story Award. "Claire," 2004
Mississippi Arts Commission Artist's Fellowship, Fiction, 2000
Texas Institute of Letters, O.Henry Award for Magazine Journalism, "Good Losers" [from The New Yorker, co-authored with Frederick Barthelme], 2000

References

External links 
 Center for Writers at USM
 Faculty Profile
 Author Page at Melville House
 Red Hen Press

Writers from Texas
Writers from Mississippi
Johns Hopkins University alumni
1947 births
Living people
20th-century American short story writers
21st-century American short story writers
20th-century American essayists
21st-century American essayists